Bobs Candies are a brand of candy manufactured by the Ferrara Candy Company.

History
Bobs Candies was founded as the Famous Candy Company in Albany, Georgia, by investor Robert E. McCormack in 1919. He changed its name to Bobs' Candy Company in 1924 and later dropped the apostrophe. It is the largest manufacturer of striped candy in the world.

McCormack was the first manufacturer to wrap his candy in cellophane. Additionally, a family member is credited with inventing a machine for twisting and cutting stick candy in 1952. A year later, he invented a machine to bend it into a cane.  The Keller Machine revolutionized the business and created a new industry - the commercial manufacture of candy canes.

In 2005, Bobs was bought from the McCormack family by Farley & Sathers, which then merged with Ferrara Pan in 2012 to become known as Ferrara Candy Company.

Products
 Sweet Stripes Soft Mints
 Sweet Stripes Mint Sticks
 Candy Canes
 Mini Candy Canes
 Peppermint Balls
 Mint Lumps
 Cherry Lumps
 Sugar Free Butterscotch Discs
 Sugar Free Starlight Mints

See also
 List of confectionery brands

References

External links
 Bob's Candy product page
 Ferrara Candy product page

Brand name confectionery
Ferrara Candy Company brands
Farley's & Sathers Candy Company brands
Food and drink companies established in 1919
American companies established in 1919